Tapiola Choir is a world-renowned and award-winning children’s choir from Espoo, Finland. During its history, Tapiola Choir has evolved from a school choir into one of the world’s best-known children’s and youth choirs. The pedagogy of singing, coined as 'Tapiola Sound' by critics, has been praised widely, and now includes a book and a DVD of the method.

Tapiola Choir was founded by Erkki Pohjola in 1963. His work was continued by Kari Ala-Pöllänen between 1994 and 2008. From 2008 onwards, the artistic director is Mr. Pasi Hyökki, also an alumnus of the choir.

Around 70 young musicians between the ages of 9 to 18 sing in the choir. They all play an instrument, too, in addition to singing. The choir is known for its rich combination of singing, playing instruments and choreography.

Tapiola Choir performs actively in Finland and abroad. The annual Christmas concerts have been a tradition since the 1960s. The choir has made dozens of recordings and won several distinguished choral competitions, such as the Silver Rose Bowl, main prize of the BBC Let the Peoples Sing choir competition (1971), and the UNESCO Prize for the Promotion of the Arts (1996). Over the years, Tapiola choir has made over 60 international concert tours everywhere around the world.

In 2017, the Ministry of Education and Culture of Finland awarded Tapiola Choir with Lapsenpäivä-palkinto for excellence in Art Education.

Conductors
 Erkki Pohjola (1963–1994)
 Kari Ala-Pöllänen (1994–2008)
 Pasi Hyökki (2008–)

See also
 Tapiola Sinfonietta

References

External links
 Tapiolan kuoro

Tapiola
Finnish choirs
Youth choirs